is a Japanese baseball pitcher who won a silver medal in the 1996 Summer Olympics.

External links
 
 

1968 births
Living people
Olympic baseball players of Japan
Olympic silver medalists for Japan
Baseball players at the 1996 Summer Olympics
Olympic medalists in baseball
Medalists at the 1996 Summer Olympics
20th-century Japanese people